Mempawah Regency (formerly the Pontianak Regency) is a regency of West Kalimantan Province of Indonesia. Since 2007 it covers 1,276.90 km2, and had a population of 234,021 at the 2010 Census and 301,560 at the 2020 Census; the official estimate as at mid 2021 was 305,673. The principal town lies at Mempawah.

History
Based on Government Regulation No. 58 of 2014 (Peraturan Pemerintah Nomor 58 Tahun 2014), Pontianak Regency was formally renamed Mempawah Regency.

Administrative Districts 
Since the separation of the southern parts of the former Pontianak Regency on 17 July 2007 to form the new Kubu Raya Regency, the residual area - in 2014 renamed as Mempawah Regency - consists of nine districts (kecamatan), tabulated below with their areas and their populations at the 2010 Census and the 2020 Census, together with the official estimates as at mid 2021. The table also includes the locations of the district administrative centres, the number of administrative villages (rural desa and urban kelurahan) in each district, and its post code.

Gallery

References

Regencies of West Kalimantan